Paolo Buglioni (born 2 November 1950) is an Italian actor and voice actor.

Biography
Born in Rome, Buglioni started his acting career on stage and he eventually found a place in the dubbing community. He is the regular Italian dubbed voice of Nick Nolte, Alec Baldwin, Samuel L. Jackson and he also dubs John Candy and Brendan Gleeson in some of their movies. Buglioni is well renowned for providing the Italian voice of Eeyore in the Winnie the Pooh franchise as well as his performance as Basil in the Italian dub of The Great Mouse Detective.

Buglioni is also the Italian voice of Gargamel in The Smurfs, Flintheart Glomgold in the last two episodes of DuckTales and he even voiced Bender in the last 13 episodes of Futurama, replacing Dario Penne. Buglioni also acts on television.

Filmography

Cinema
Excellent Cadavers (1999)
Loro (2018)

Television
Edera (1992)
A Place in the Sun (2003)
Una donna per amico
Distretto di Polizia 
La squadra 
Don Matteo 
Lo zio d'America (2002)
Carabinieri 
Tutti i sogni del mondo (2003)
RIS Delitti Imperfetti 
Provaci ancora prof 
Cotti e mangiati 
Ho sposato uno sbirro 
Romanzo criminale – La serie 
Fratelli detective (2009) – TV Film
Il delitto di via Poma (2011) – TV Film
Rocco Schiavone

Dubbing roles

Animation
Basil in The Great Mouse Detective
Eeyore in The Many Adventures of Winnie the Pooh
Eeyore in Pooh's Grand Adventure: The Search for Christopher Robin
Eeyore in The Tigger Movie
Eeyore in Piglet's Big Movie
Eeyore in Pooh's Heffalump Movie
Eeyore in Winnie the Pooh
Eeyore in The New Adventures of Winnie the Pooh
Eeyore in The Book of Pooh
Eeyore in My Friends Tigger & Pooh
Gargamel in The Smurfs
Jack in Oggy and the Cockroaches
Franklin Bean in Fantastic Mr. Fox
Bender Bending Rodríguez in Futurama (season 7x14+)
Jerry Slugworth in Monsters, Inc.
The Brain in Pinky, Elmyra & the Brain
Cobra Bubbles in Lilo & Stitch
Cobra Bubbles in Stitch! The Movie
Cloak in The Wild
Papa Bear in Looney Tunes: Back in Action
Oscar in Ice Age
Shaw in Open Season
Shaw in Open Season: Scared Silly
Flintheart Glomgold in DuckTales (Ep. 98-100)
Nick Fury in Iron Man: Rise of Technovore
Joe in Help! I'm a Fish
Nicky Flippers in Hoodwinked!
Producer in 101 Dalmatians II: Patch's London Adventure
Murphy in Spirit: Stallion of the Cimarron
Zaragoza in The Road to El Dorado
Tennessee O'Neal in The Country Bears
Mayor Phlegmming in Osmosis Jones
Corporal in Penguins of Madagascar
Silversmith in Barbie as Rapunzel
Alec Baldwin in Team America: World Police
Rhinokey in The Wuzzles
Abraham Lincoln in Animaniacs

Live action
Mace Windu in Star Wars: Episode I – The Phantom Menace
Mace Windu in Star Wars: Episode II – Attack of the Clones
Mace Windu in Star Wars: Episode III – Revenge of the Sith
Nick Fury in Iron Man
Nick Fury in Iron Man 2
Nick Fury in Thor
Nick Fury in Captain America: The First Avenger
Nick Fury in The Avengers
Nick Fury in Captain America: The Winter Soldier
Nick Fury in Avengers: Age of Ultron
Nick Fury in Avengers: Infinity War
Nick Fury in Captain Marvel
Nick Fury in Spider-Man: Far From Home
Alastor Moody in Harry Potter and the Goblet of Fire
Alastor Moody in Harry Potter and the Order of the Phoenix
Alastor Moody in Harry Potter and the Deathly Hallows – Part 1
Gargamel in The Smurfs
Gargamel in The Smurfs 2
Alan Hunley in Mission: Impossible – Rogue Nation
Alan Hunley in Mission: Impossible – Fallout
Mick Dugan in Working Girl
Dr. Jed Hill in Malice
Lamont Cranston in The Shadow
Nicholas Kudrow in Mercury Rising
Stan Indursky in Along Came Polly
Juan Trippe in The Aviator
Phil DeVoss in Elizabethtown
Sam Murach in The Good Shepherd
John Foy in To Rome with Love
Hal Francis in Blue Jasmine
John Howland in Still Alice
General Dixon in Aloha
Robert Maheu in Rules Don't Apply
Dr. Kennebrew Beauregard in BlacKkKlansman
Learoyd in Farewell to the King
Lionel Dobie in New York Stories
Jack Cates in Another 48 Hrs.
Pete Bell in Blue Chips
Peter Brackett in I Love Trouble
Wade Whitehouse in Affliction
Gordon Tall in The Thin Red Line
Adam Verver in The Golden Bowl
David Banner in Hulk
Socrates in Peaceful Warrior
Donal Fitzgerald in The Company You Keep
Samyaza in Noah
Stephen Katz in A Walk in the Woods
Frank Stockburn in The Ridiculous 6
Andrew Stirling in Amos & Andrew
Dale Deveaux in The New Age
Colonel Ron in The Search for One-eye Jimmy
Jimmy in Hard Eight
John Shaft II in Shaft
Tom McCourt in Cell
Gus Polinski in Home Alone
Gerry Boyle in The Guard
Joseph Lynch in Assassin's Creed
Spike Nolan in Brewster's Millions
Coleman in Trading Places
Ron Witwicky in Transformers
John Landon in Rise of the Planet of the Apes
Clay Morrow in Sons of Anarchy
Ed Green in Law & Order
Eugene Young in The Practice

References

External links

1950 births
Living people
Male actors from Rome
Italian male voice actors
Italian male stage actors
Italian male television actors
Italian male film actors
Italian voice directors
20th-century Italian male actors
21st-century Italian male actors